

Lower LaHave 
Lower LaHave and the smaller area of Five Houses is a small village in Nova Scotia, Canada on the shore of the LaHave River. The community is located in the Municipality of the District of Lunenburg in Lunenburg County.

Geography

Lower LaHave covers a vast tracts of undeveloped forest land overlooking the LaHave River banks. It is anchored by history and marked with the Lower LaHave Commons. Part of Lower LaHave Area feature is an area known as "The Shobac", named for the land granted to Christian Shoubach.

External links
 Kingsburg Nova Scotia Community Association
Municipality of the District of Lunenburg

Communities in Lunenburg County, Nova Scotia
General Service Areas in Nova Scotia